Mesgarabad (also Romanized as Mesgarābād; also known as Miskarābād) is a village in Siyahrud Rural District of the Central District of Tehran County, Tehran province, Iran. At the 2006 National Census, its population was 3,435 in 834 households, when it was in Ghaniabad Rural District in the Central District of Ray County. The following census in 2011 counted 3,121 people in 879 households, by which time most of Siyahrud Rural District had transferred to the newly established Pardis County. The latest census in 2016 showed a population of 2,265 people in 722 households; it was the largest village in its rural district.

References 

Tehran County

Populated places in Tehran Province

Populated places in Tehran County